GRW +70 8247 is a white dwarf star located 42 light-years from Earth in the constellation Draco. With a magnitude of about 13 it is visible only through a large telescope.

Properties
Although photographed in the 19th century as part of the Carte du Ciel project, the star was not determined to be a white dwarf until G. P. Kuiper observed it in 1934. This makes it the fifth or sixth white dwarf discovered. At first, its spectrum was thought to be almost featureless, but later observation showed it to have unusual broad, shallow absorption bands. In 1970, when light that it emitted was observed to be circularly polarized, it became the first white dwarf known to have a magnetic field. In the 1980s, it was realized that the unusual absorption bands could be explained as hydrogen absorption lines shifted by the Zeeman effect.

Notes

References

Draco (constellation)
White dwarfs
0742